Laezza is an Italian surname. Notable people with the surname include:

Giuliano Laezza (born 1993), Italian footballer
Giuseppe Laezza (1835–1905), Italian painter

Italian-language surnames